The Allied Supermen of America was created as an homage to the Golden Age Justice Society of America and the Silver Age Justice League.

Fictional team history
Kid Supreme was "dropped off" at World War II by the time travelling League of Infinity (a homage to the Silver Age Legion of Super Heroes). There he met this superhero team and soon joined. The team disbanded in 1949. However, the team later joined again in the 1970s as the "Allies", an homage to the current Justice League. When they reformed as the Allies, Spacehunter (Martian Manhunter) and Fisherman (Green Arrow) joined. Supreme returned to his normal time . Supreme reformed the team to battle Hulver Ramik, who was working for Optilux. The team donned special helmets to enter the astral plane that Optilux was using to trap the souls of heroes (include Prof. Night). The team freed the souls and trapped Optilux. Among the trapped souls were Polyman (Plastic Man) and Stormbirds (Blackhawks). The team helped Supreme defeat Darius Dax (Lex Luthor), who had a robotic body. However, due to the Supremium in his robotic body, he fell back in time and became the very meteor that gave Supreme his powers.

Members
Rob Leifeld created these heroes who would eventually be revealed to be members of the ASA:
 Die Hard (Captain America) - He is America's first cyborg.
 Glory (Wonder Woman) - She is half Amazon warrior and half demon. 
 Supreme (Superman) - He received Superman-like powers from a meteor
For Savage Dragon, Erik Larsen created these characters who would eventually be revealed to be members of the ASA:
 Mighty Man (Captain Marvel) - He is a cosmic entity that is passed from person to person allowing his host to transform into a blonde man that has flight, super strength and speed.
 SuperPatriot (Captain America) - He was a Golden Age patriotic hero who would later be rebuilt into a cyborg.
In Supreme #43, Alan Moore fleshed out the ASA concept creating the following new members: 
 Alley Cat (Catwoman and Black Canary) - She was costumed heroine who wore fishnets and carried a whip.
 Black Hand (Green Lantern) - He wore a light on his chest that allowed him to make shadow puppets that could affect tangible objects. He is not to be  confused with the DC comic character of the same name.
 Doc Rocket (Flash / Bulletman) - He was a super speedster. He had a granddaughter with the same name and powers.
 Jack O' Lantern (Spectre) - He is another cosmic entity that used humans as hosts. He seems to have magical powers. He can summon objects (He once summoned an over-sized lawnmowers to mow down his foes).
 Professor Night (Batman and Dr. Mid-Nite) - He is a Batman-type hero with a female sidekick Twilight.
 Roy Roman the Mer-Master (Namor and Aquaman) - He can fly, breathe underwater and has super strength. Roman is backwards word of Namor, hence the name.
 Storybook Smith (Johnny Thunder) - He can rewrite reality via his storybook.
 Waxman (Sandman) - He has a "Wax Gun".
When the team became the Allies, two new members joined:
Spacehunter (Martian Manhunter) - He was an alien with the alter ego of Steve Strong. He had telepathy and flight.
Fisherman (Green Arrow)

References
1.http://www.cosmicteams.com/jla/jlafaq07.html 
2.http://www.comicvine.com/glory/29-25000/ 
3.http://www.comicvine.com/mighty-man/29-5217/ 
4.http://www.comicvine.com/doc-rocket/29-42032/ 
5.http://www.comicvine.com/roman/29-5258/ 
6.http://www.comicvine.com/spacehunter/29-52657/ 
7.Youngblood # 5

Image Comics superhero teams
Characters created by Rob Liefeld